This is a list of publicly accessible, motorable passes in the Free State Province, South Africa.

See also
Mountain Passes of South Africa

Free State
Mountain passes
Mountain passes of Free State
Mountain passes of Free State